Weller is a surname borne by:

People
 Archie Weller (born 1957), Australian writer
 Craig Weller (born 1981), Canadian ice hockey player
 Dieter Weller, American engineer 
 Don Weller (musician) (born 1940), British tenor saxophonist
 Don Weller (painter), American illustrator and painter
 Duncan Weller (born 1975), children's book author and visual artist
 Franz Weller (1901–1944), World War II German Army officer
 Freddy Weller (born 1947), American country music singer/songwriter
 George Weller (1907–2002), American novelist, playwright, and Pulitzer Prize-winning journalist
 George Russell Weller (1916–2010?), elderly Californian motorist who accidentally drove through a crowd, killing 10
 Hermann Weller (1878–1956), German scholar and poet
 Jerry Weller (born 1957), American politician
 Joe Weller (born 1996), British YouTuber and amateur boxer
 John Weller (disambiguation), several people
 Keith Weller (1946–2004), English footballer
 Lachie Weller (born 1966), Australian rules footballer
 Lance Weller, American novelist
 Louis Weller (1904–1979), Native-American National Football League player
 Louis Weller (footballer) (1887–1952), English footballer
 Marc Weller (born 1951), French former football goalkeeper
 Mary Louise Weller, American actress
 Michael Weller (born 1942), American playwright and screenwriter
 Michael J. Weller (born 1946), British artist and writer
 Ovington E. Weller (1862–1947), U.S. Senator from Maryland
 Paul Weller (born 1958), British singer and songwriter
 Paul Weller (footballer) (born 1975), English former footballer
 Paul Weller (politician) (born 1959), Australian politician
 Peter Weller (born 1947), American actor
 Ronny Weller (born 1969), German weightlifter
 Sam Weller (disambiguation)
 Samuel A. Weller (1851–1925), American pottery manufacturer
 Stuart Weller (1870–1927), American paleontologist and geologist
 Thomas Huckle Weller (1915–2008), American virologist and Nobel laureate
 Walter Weller (1939–2015), Austrian conductor and violinist
 William Weller (1799–1863), entrepreneur and official in Upper Canada and Canada West
 Worth Hamilton Weller (1913–1932) American herpetologist, discovered Weller's Salamander
 Weller brothers, Joseph Brooks (1802–1835), George (1805–1875) and Edward (1814–1893), English whalers, merchants and early settlers of New Zealand and Australia

Fictional characters 
 Conrad/Conrart Weller, in the Japanese series of light novels Kyo Kara Maoh!
 Sam Weller (character), in the Charles Dickens novel The Pickwick Papers
 Tony Weller, father of Sam Weller in The Pickwick Papers

English-language surnames
German-language surnames